Harvey Parker may refer to:
 Harvey D. Parker (1805–1884), Boston hotel owner
 Harvey Parker (politician) (1834–1892), lumber merchant and politician in Quebec

See also
 Harvey Pekar, American underground comic book writer